Brothers War may refer to:
 The Austro-Prussian War of 1866
 The War of Brothers of 1988–1990 in Lebanon
 The Battle of Gaza (2007) between Hamas and Fatah

See also
 
 Fratricide